The Brabant Party (Brabantse Partij) is a provincial political party in the Dutch province of North Brabant. It has no parliamentary representation, but it is linked to the Independent Senate Group.

Its main issues are family farmers' rights, investment in nanotechnology, information and communications technology (ICT), sport and culture, and a more open government.

References

External links
Official website

Regionalist parties in the Netherlands
Politics of North Brabant